Sir Richard Lane  (c.1667–1756), of Worcester was a British merchant, sugar-baker and  politician who sat in the House of Commons between 1721 and 1734. He became a prominent figure in the salt trade

Biography
Lane was the eldest son of Richard Lane of St. Augustine's, Bristol, sugar-baker, merchant and mayor of Bristol and his wife  Susanna. He married by licence dated 3 January 1692, Sarah Davie of Salford, Lancashire. He moved to Worcester, where he was established as a merchant and sugar-baker by 1699. In 1705 he succeeded his father. He was Mayor of Worcester for the year 1709 to 1710.  In July 1710, while mayor, he put a stop to the ‘insolent progress of Dr. Sacheverel and his deluded followers’. He was High Sheriff of Worcestershire for the year 1714 to 1715, the first year of King George the First, and raised 'the posse comitatus and (thro’ God’s blessing) defeated great numbers of' Jacobites 'who came in tumults there with arms'.  He was knighted on 21 October 1714.

Lane was returned as Member of Parliament for Minehead, at a by-election on 18 December 1721. However he had taken the writ from messenger  who was supposed to take it to the returning officer, and kept it in his pocket until  the election.day. The messenger was taken into custody of the serjeant-at-arms but Lane escaped punishment. He was later unseated on petition on 9 January 1722.

In 1725, some people involved in the Cheshire salt works discovered that the strongest brine lay below the depth of the pits in Droitwich. Lane gave the order to sink through the talc at the bottom of the pits, and  the strong brine burst out with such violent abundance, that two men who working in the pit were thrown to the surface and killed. Soon after everyone sunk his pit through the talc and obtained so much strong brine that much of it was wasted, From then on the old pits, which had been worth near £5,000 a year, became valueless.

Lane was returned for Worcester after a contest at the  1727 British general election. He supported the Administration consistently and was rewarded with the appointment of his eldest son as receiver general of the land tax for Worcestershire, while his second son was appointed a commissioner for licensing hawkers and pedlars. In March 1732 Lane spoke in favour of the free export of wool and yarn from Ireland.  He was a salt exporter and at this time he was involved in a protracted lawsuit with the salt commissioners on a claim for nearly £23,000 for  allowances on shipments of salt to Ireland over a period of six months. He protested against the export of rock salt to Ireland because, as there was no restriction on refining it there, it would undercut his own salt.  He did not stand in     1734.

Lane died, aged 89,  on 29 March 1756 and was buried in the North ambulatory of Westminster Abbey. He left four sons and five daughters of whom three were Ann, Sarah and Mary.

References

1660s births
1756 deaths
Members of the Parliament of Great Britain for English constituencies
British MPs 1715–1722
British MPs 1727–1734
Mayors of places in Worcestershire
High Sheriffs of Worcestershire